Ludacris (born 1977), nicknamed "Luda", is an American rapper.

Luda may also refer to:

People
Luda (singer), South Korean singer
Luda Kroitor, an Australian salsa dancer
Dvorska Luda, Montenegrin rapper
a diminutive of Ludmila (given name)

Places

1158 Luda, a minor planet
 Lüda, a former name of Dalian, China
Luda Kamchiya Gorge, gorge in the Balkan Mountains
Luda Kamchiya, a river in eastern Bulgaria
Luda Yana, river in southern Bulgaria

Other uses
Luda class destroyer, a Chinese ship class
Luda (planthopper), an insect genus in the Delphacini

See also
 Ludo (disambiguation)